This page lists all described species of the spider family Ctenidae accepted by the World Spider Catalog :

A

Acantheis

Acantheis Thorell, 1891
 A. boetonensis (Strand, 1913) — Indonesia (Sulawesi)
 A. celer (Simon, 1897) — Indonesia (Java)
 A. dimidiatus (Thorell, 1890) — Indonesia (Sumatra)
 A. indicus Gravely, 1931 — India
 A. laetus (Thorell, 1890) — Borneo
 A. longiventris Simon, 1897 — Malaysia, Indonesia
 A. nipponicus Ono, 2008 — Japan
 A. oreus (Simon, 1901) — Malaysia
 A. variatus (Thorell, 1890) (type) — Indonesia (Nias Is.)

Acanthoctenus

Acanthoctenus Keyserling, 1877
 A. alux Arizala, Labarque & Polotow, 2021 — Guatemala
 A. chickeringi Arizala, Labarque & Polotow, 2021 — Panama
 A. dumicola Simon, 1906 — Venezuela
 A. gaujoni Simon, 1906 — Ecuador
 A. kollari (Reimoser, 1939) — Costa Rica
 A. lamarrei Arizala, Labarque & Polotow, 2021 — Panama
 A. maculatus Petrunkevitch, 1925 — Panama
 A. manauara Arizala, Labarque & Polotow, 2021 — Brazil
 A. obauratus Simon, 1906 — Brazil
 A. plebejus Simon, 1906 — Trinidad and Tobago
 A. remotus Chickering, 1960 — Jamaica
 A. rubrotaeniatus Mello-Leitão, 1947 — Brazil
 A. spiniger Keyserling, 1877 (type) — Mexico
 A. spinipes Keyserling, 1877 — Colombia
 A. torotoro Arizala, Labarque & Polotow, 2021 — Bolivia
 A. virginea (Kraus, 1955) — El Salvador

Africactenus

Africactenus Hyatt, 1954
 A. acteninus Benoit, 1974 — Congo
 A. agilior (Pocock, 1900) (type) — West, Central Africa
 A. decorosus (Arts, 1912) — Cameroon, Ivory Coast, Congo
 A. depressus Hyatt, 1954 — Cameroon
 A. evadens Steyn & Jocqué, 2003 — Ivory Coast, Guinea
 A. fernandensis (Simon, 1909) — Equatorial Guinea (Bioko)
 A. ghesquierei (Lessert, 1946) — Congo
 A. giganteus Benoit, 1974 — Congo
 A. guineensis (Simon, 1897) — Sierra Leone
 A. kribiensis Hyatt, 1954 — Cameroon, Gabon
 A. leleupi Benoit, 1975 — Congo
 A. longurio (Simon, 1909) — West Africa
 A. monitor Steyn & Jocqué, 2003 — Ivory Coast
 A. pococki Hyatt, 1954 — Cameroon, Gabon
 A. poecilus (Thorell, 1899) — Cameroon, Gabon
 A. simoni Hyatt, 1954 — Cameroon
 A. sladeni Hyatt, 1954 — Cameroon
 A. tenuitarsis (Strand, 1908) — Cameroon
 A. tridentatus Hyatt, 1954 — Zimbabwe
 A. trilateralis Hyatt, 1954 — Cameroon, Gabon
 A. unumus Sankaran & Sebastian, 2018 — India

Afroneutria

Afroneutria Polotow & Jocqué, 2015
 A. erythrochelis (Simon, 1876) — West, Central, East Africa
 A. hybrida Polotow & Jocqué, 2015 — Tanzania
 A. immortalis (Arts, 1912) — Kenya, Tanzania
 A. quadrimaculata Polotow & Jocqué, 2015 — Congo
 A. tanga Polotow & Jocqué, 2016 — Tanzania
 A. velox (Blackwall, 1865) (type) — Congo, Tanzania, Malawi, Zimbabwe, Mozambique

Amauropelma

Amauropelma Raven, Stumkat & Gray, 2001
 A. annegretae Jäger, 2012 — Laos
 A. anzses Raven & Stumkat, 2001 — Australia (Queensland)
 A. beyersdorfi Jäger, 2012 — India
 A. bluewater Raven & Stumkat, 2001 — Australia (Queensland)
 A. claudie Raven & Stumkat, 2001 — Australia (Queensland)
 A. ekeftys Jäger, 2012 — India
 A. fungiferum (Thorell, 1890) — Malaysia
 A. gayundah Raven & Stumkat, 2001 — Australia (Queensland)
 A. gordon Raven & Stumkat, 2001 — Australia (Queensland)
 A. hasenpuschi Raven & Stumkat, 2001 — Australia (Queensland)
 A. hoffmanni Jäger, 2012 — Laos
 A. jagelkii Jäger, 2012 — Laos
 A. leo Raven & Stumkat, 2001 — Australia (Queensland)
 A. matakecil Miller & Rahmadi, 2012 — Indonesia (Java)
 A. mcilwraith Raven & Stumkat, 2001 — Australia (Queensland)
 A. monteithi Raven & Stumkat, 2001 — Australia (Queensland)
 A. mossman Raven & Stumkat, 2001 — Australia (Queensland)
 A. pineck Raven & Stumkat, 2001 — Australia (Queensland)
 A. rifleck Raven & Stumkat, 2001 — Australia (Queensland)
 A. staschi Jäger, 2012 — India
 A. torbjorni Raven & Gray, 2001 — Australia (Queensland)
 A. trueloves Raven & Stumkat, 2001 (type) — Australia (Queensland)
 A. undara Raven & Gray, 2001 — Australia (Queensland)
 A. wallaman Raven & Stumkat, 2001 — Australia (Queensland)

Amicactenus

Amicactenus Henrard & Jocqué, 2017
 A. eminens (Arts, 1912) — Togo, Ivory Coast
 A. fallax (Steyn & Van der Donckt, 2003) — Ivory Coast
 A. mysticus Henrard & Jocqué, 2017 — Guinea, Liberia
 A. pergulanus (Arts, 1912) (type) — West, Central Africa

Anahita

Anahita Karsch, 1879
 A. aculeata (Simon, 1897) — West, Central Africa
 A. blandini Benoit, 1977 — Ivory Coast
 A. centralis Benoit, 1977 — Central Africa
 A. concrassata Benoit, 1977 — Burundi
 A. concreata Benoit, 1977 — Congo
 A. concussor Benoit, 1977 — Congo
 A. denticulata (Simon, 1884) — Myanmar, Indonesia (Simeulue)
 A. faradjensis Lessert, 1929 — Congo
 A. fauna Karsch, 1879 (type) — Russia (Far East), China, Korea, Japan, Taiwan
 A. feae (F. O. Pickard-Cambridge, 1902) — Myanmar
 A. jianfengensis Zhang, Hu & Han, 2011 — China
 A. jinsi Jäger, 2012 — China
 A. jucunda (Thorell, 1897) — Myanmar
 A. lineata Simon, 1897 — Ivory Coast, Congo
 A. lycosina (Simon, 1897) — West Africa
 A. mamma Karsch, 1884 — West, Central, East Africa
 A. maolan Zhu, Chen & Song, 1999 — China, Taiwan
 A. nathani Strand, 1907 — Bahama Is.
 A. pallida (L. Koch, 1875) — Egypt, Ethiopia
 A. popa Jäger & Minn, 2015 — Myanmar
 A. punctata (Thorell, 1890) — Indonesia (Sumatra)
 A. punctulata (Hentz, 1844) — USA
 A. pygmaea Benoit, 1977 — Ivory Coast
 A. samplexa Yin, Tang & Gong, 2000 — China, Korea
 A. similis Caporiacco, 1947 — Central, East Africa
 A. smythiesi (Simon, 1897) — India
 A. syriaca (O. Pickard-Cambridge, 1872) — Cyprus, Israel
 A. wuyiensis Li, Jin & Zhang, 2014 — China
 A. zoroides Schmidt & Krause, 1994 — Comoros

Ancylometes

Ancylometes Bertkau, 1880
 A. amazonicus Simon, 1898 — Peru, Brazil
 A. birabeni (Carcavallo & Martínez, 1961) — Argentina
 A. bogotensis (Keyserling, 1877) — Honduras to Bolivia
 A. concolor (Perty, 1833) (type) — Brazil, Bolivia, Paraguay, Argentina
 A. hewitsoni (F. O. Pickard-Cambridge, 1897) — Bolivia, Brazil
 A. japura Höfer & Brescovit, 2000 — Brazil
 A. jau Höfer & Brescovit, 2000 — Brazil
 A. pantanal Höfer & Brescovit, 2000 — Brazil
 A. riparius Höfer & Brescovit, 2000 — Brazil
 A. rufus (Walckenaer, 1837) — Northern South America
 A. terrenus Höfer & Brescovit, 2000 — Brazil

Apolania

Apolania Simon, 1898
 A. segmentata Simon, 1898 (type) — Seychelles

Arctenus

Arctenus Polotow & Jocqué, 2014
 A. taitensis Polotow & Jocqué, 2014 (type) — Kenya

Asthenoctenus

Asthenoctenus Simon, 1897
 A. borellii Simon, 1897 (type) — Brazil, Uruguay, Paraguay, Argentina
 A. bulimus (Strand, 1909) — Brazil
 A. hingstoni (Mello-Leitão, 1948) — Guyana
 A. longistylus Brescovit & Simó, 1998 — Brazil
 A. tarsalis (F. O. Pickard-Cambridge, 1902) — Brazil
 A. tigrinus Mello-Leitão, 1938 — Argentina

B

Bengalla

Bengalla Gray & Thompson, 2001
 B. bertmaini Gray & Thompson, 2001 (type) — Australia (Western Australia)

Bulboctenus

Bulboctenus Pereira, Labarque & Polotow, 2020
 B. itunaitata Pereira, Labarque & Polotow, 2020 — Brazil
 B. kayapo Pereira, Labarque & Polotow, 2020 (type) — Brazil
 B. munduruku Pereira, Labarque & Polotow, 2020 — Brazil

C

Califorctenus

Califorctenus Jiménez, Berrian, Polotow & Palacios-Cardiel, 2017
 C. cacachilensis Jiménez, Berrian, Polotow & Palacios-Cardiel, 2017 (type) — Mexico

Caloctenus

Caloctenus Keyserling, 1877
 C. abyssinicus Strand, 1917 — Ethiopia
 C. aculeatus Keyserling, 1877 (type) — Colombia
 C. albertoi Hazzi & Silva-Dávila, 2012 — Colombia
 C. carbonera Silva-Dávila, 2004 — Venezuela
 C. gracilitarsis Simon, 1897 — Venezuela
 C. oxapampa Silva-Dávila, 2004 — Peru

Celaetycheus

Celaetycheus Simon, 1897
 C. abara Polotow & Brescovit, 2013 — Brazil
 C. aberem Polotow & Brescovit, 2013 — Brazil
 C. acaraje Polotow & Brescovit, 2013 — Brazil
 C. beiju Polotow & Brescovit, 2013 — Brazil
 C. bobo Polotow & Brescovit, 2013 — Brazil
 C. caruru Polotow & Brescovit, 2013 — Brazil
 C. flavostriatus Simon, 1897 (type) — Brazil
 C. moqueca Polotow & Brescovit, 2013 — Brazil
 C. mungunza Polotow & Brescovit, 2013 — Brazil
 C. vatapa Polotow & Brescovit, 2013 — Brazil

Centroctenus

Centroctenus Mello-Leitão, 1929
 C. acara Brescovit, 1996 — Brazil
 C. alinahui Brescovit, Torres, Rego & Polotow, 2020 — Ecuador
 C. auberti (Caporiacco, 1954) — Venezuela, Brazil, French Guiana
 C. chalkidisi Brescovit, Torres, Rego & Polotow, 2020 — Brazil
 C. claudia Brescovit, Torres, Rego & Polotow, 2020 — Brazil
 C. coloso Brescovit, Torres, Rego & Polotow, 2020 — Colombia
 C. dourados Brescovit, Torres, Rego & Polotow, 2020 — Brezil
 C. irupana Brescovit, 1996 — Bolivia
 C. miriuma Brescovit, 1996 — Brazil
 C. ocelliventer (Strand, 1909) (type) — Colombia, Brazil
 C. varzea Brescovit, Torres, Rego & Polotow, 2020 — Brazil

Chococtenus

Chococtenus Dupérré, 2015
 C. acanthoctenoides (Schmidt, 1956) — Ecuador
 C. cappuccino Dupérré, 2015 — Ecuador
 C. cuchilla Dupérré, 2015 — Ecuador
 C. duendecito Dupérré, 2015 — Ecuador
 C. fantasma Dupérré, 2015 — Ecuador
 C. kashakara Dupérré, 2015 — Ecuador
 C. lasdamas Dupérré, 2015 — Ecuador
 C. luchoi Dupérré, 2015 — Ecuador
 C. miserabilis (Strand, 1916) — Colombia
 C. neblina Dupérré, 2015 — Ecuador
 C. otonga Dupérré, 2015 (type) — Ecuador
 C. otongachi Dupérré, 2015 — Ecuador
 C. piemontana Dupérré, 2015 — Ecuador
 C. suffuscus Dupérré, 2015 — Ecuador
 C. waitti Dupérré, 2015 — Ecuador

Ciba

Ciba Bloom, Binford, Esposito, Alayón, Peterson, Nishida, Loubet-Senear & Agnarsson, 2014
 C. calzada (Alayón, 1985) (type) — Cuba
 C. seibo Alayón & Agnarsson, 2014 — Dominican Rep.

Ctenus

Ctenus Walckenaer, 1805
 C. abditus Arts, 1912 — Congo, Tanzania
 C. adustus (Keyserling, 1877) — Colombia
 C. agroecoides (Thorell, 1881) — Australia (Queensland)
 C. albofasciatus F. O. Pickard-Cambridge, 1897 — Brazil
 C. alienus F. O. Pickard-Cambridge, 1900 — Guatemala
 C. amanensis Strand, 1907 — East Africa
 C. amphora Mello-Leitão, 1930 — Colombia, Brazil, Guyana
 C. anahitaeformis Benoit, 1981 — Burundi
 C. anahitiformis Strand, 1909 — Brazil
 C. andamanensis Gravely, 1931 — India
 C. angigitanus Roewer, 1938 — New Guinea
 C. angularis Roewer, 1938 — Indonesia (Aru Is.)
 C. argentipes Hasselt, 1893 — Indonesia (Sumatra)
 C. aruanus Strand, 1911 — Indonesia (Aru Is.)
 C. auricomus Arts, 1912 — Central, East Africa
 C. avidus Bryant, 1948 — Hispaniola
 C. bahamensis Strand, 1907 — Bahama Is.
 C. bantaengi Merian, 1911 — Indonesia (Sulawesi)
 C. barbatus Thorell, 1895 — Myanmar
 C. bayeri Jäger, 2012 — Laos
 C. bicolor (Bertkau, 1880) — Brazil
 C. bicostatus Thorell, 1890 — Borneo
 C. bigibbosus Benoit, 1980 — Congo
 C. bilobatus F. O. Pickard-Cambridge, 1900 — Mexico
 C. blumenauensis Strand, 1909 — Brazil
 C. bolivicola Strand, 1907 — Bolivia
 C. bomdilaensis Tikader & Malhotra, 1981 — India
 C. bowonglangi Merian, 1911 — Indonesia (Sulawesi)
 C. bueanus Strand, 1916 — Cameroon
 C. calcaratus F. O. Pickard-Cambridge, 1900 — Guatemala
 C. calcarifer F. O. Pickard-Cambridge, 1902 — Borneo
 C. calderitas Alayón, 2002 — Mexico
 C. caligineus Arts, 1912 — Central, East Africa
 C. captiosus Gertsch, 1935 — USA
 C. capulinus (Karsch, 1879) — West, Central Africa
 C. catherine Polotow & Brescovit, 2012 — Jamaica
 C. cavaticus Arts, 1912 — Congo, Angola
 C. celebensis Pocock, 1897 — Indonesia (Sulawesi)
 C. celisi Benoit, 1981 — Congo
 C. ceylonensis F. O. Pickard-Cambridge, 1897 — Sri Lanka
 C. cladarus Jäger, 2012 — Myanmar
 C. coccineipes Pocock, 1903 — West, Central Africa
 C. cochinensis Gravely, 1931 — India
 C. colombianus Mello-Leitão, 1941 — Colombia
 C. colonicus Arts, 1912 — East Africa
 C. complicatus Franganillo, 1946 — Cuba
 C. constrictus Benoit, 1981 — Congo
 C. convexus F. O. Pickard-Cambridge, 1900 — Mexico to Costa Rica
 C. corniger F. O. Pickard-Cambridge, 1898 — South Africa
 C. cruciatus Franganillo, 1930 — Cuba
 C. crulsi Mello-Leitão, 1930 — Brazil
 C. dangsus Reddy & Patel, 1994 — India
 C. darlingtoni Bryant, 1948 — Hispaniola
 C. datus Strand, 1909 — Ecuador
 C. decemnotatus Simon, 1909 — Guinea-Bissau
 C. decorus (Gerstaecker, 1873) — East Africa
 C. delesserti (Caporiacco, 1947) — Guyana
 C. denticulatus Benoit, 1981 — Congo
 C. dilucidus Simon, 1909 — Congo
 C. doloensis Caporiacco, 1940 — Ethiopia
 C. drassoides (Karsch, 1879) — Colombia
 C. dreyeri Strand, 1906 — Cameroon
 C. dubius Walckenaer, 1805 (type) — French Guiana
 C. efferatus Arts, 1912 — Congo
 C. elgonensis Benoit, 1978 — Kenya
 C. ellacomei F. O. Pickard-Cambridge, 1902 — Suriname
 C. embolus Benoit, 1981 — Congo
 C. ensiger F. O. Pickard-Cambridge, 1900 — Mexico
 C. esculentus Arts, 1912 — Cameroon, Congo
 C. excavatus F. O. Pickard-Cambridge, 1900 — Mexico
 C. exlineae Peck, 1981 — USA
 C. facetus Arts, 1912 — Congo, East Africa
 C. falcatus F. O. Pickard-Cambridge, 1902 — St. Lucia
 C. falciformis Benoit, 1981 — Congo
 C. falconensis Schenkel, 1953 — Venezuela
 C. fasciatus Mello-Leitão, 1943 — Brazil
 C. fernandae Brescovit & Simó, 2007 — Brazil
 C. feshius Benoit, 1979 — Congo
 C. flavidus Hogg, 1922 — Vietnam
 C. floweri F. O. Pickard-Cambridge, 1897 — Malaysia
 C. goaensis Bastawade & Borkar, 2008 — India
 C. guantanamo (Alayón, 2001) — Cuba
 C. gulosus Arts, 1912 — South Africa
 C. haina Alayón, 2004 — Hispaniola
 C. haitiensis Strand, 1909 — Hispaniola
 C. hibernalis Hentz, 1844 — USA
 C. hiemalis Bryant, 1948 — Hispaniola
 C. himalayensis Gravely, 1931 — India
 C. holmi Benoit, 1978 — Kenya
 C. holthoffi Jäger, 2012 — Laos
 C. hosei F. O. Pickard-Cambridge, 1897 — Borneo
 C. humilis (Keyserling, 1887) — Nicaragua
 C. hygrophilus Benoit, 1977 — Congo
 C. idjwiensis Benoit, 1979 — Congo
 C. inaja Höfer, Brescovit & Gasnier, 1994 — Colombia, Peru, Bolivia, Brazil
 C. indicus Gravely, 1931 — India
 C. insulanus Bryant, 1948 — Hispaniola
 C. jaminauensis Mello-Leitão, 1936 — Brazil
 C. jaragua Alayón, 2004 — Hispaniola
 C. javanus Pocock, 1897 — Indonesia (Java)
 C. kandyensis Kim & Ye, 2014 — Sri Lanka
 C. kapuri Tikader, 1973 — India (Andaman Is.)
 C. kenyamontanus Benoit, 1978 — Kenya
 C. kipatimus Benoit, 1981 — Tanzania
 C. kochi Simon, 1897 — New Guinea
 C. lacertus Benoit, 1979 — Congo
 C. latitabundus Arts, 1912 — Central, East Africa
 C. lejeunei Benoit, 1977 — Congo
 C. leonardi Simon, 1909 — West Africa
 C. levipes Arts, 1912 — Tanzania
 C. lishuqiang Jäger, 2012 — China
 C. longicalcar Kraus, 1955 — El Salvador
 C. lubwensis Benoit, 1979 — Congo
 C. macellarius Simon, 1909 — Congo
 C. maculatus Franganillo, 1931 — Cuba
 C. maculisternis Strand, 1909 — Bolivia, Brazil
 C. magnificus Arts, 1912 — West Africa
 C. malvernensis Petrunkevitch, 1910 — Jamaica
 C. manauara Höfer, Brescovit & Gasnier, 1994 — Brazil
 C. manni Bryant, 1948 — Hispaniola
 C. marginatus Walckenaer, 1847 — Fiji, Solomon Is.
 C. martensi Jäger, 2012 — Nepal
 C. medius Keyserling, 1891 — Panama, Brazil
 C. meghalayaensis Tikader, 1976 — India
 C. minimus F. O. Pickard-Cambridge, 1897 — North America
 C. minor F. O. Pickard-Cambridge, 1897 — Brazil
 C. mitchelli Gertsch, 1971 — Mexico
 C. modestus Simon, 1897 — Tanzania (Zanzibar, Kenya)
 C. monaghani Jäger, 2013 — Laos
 C. monticola Bryant, 1948 — Hispaniola
 C. musosanus Benoit, 1979 — Congo
 C. naranjo Alayón, 2004 — Hispaniola
 C. narashinhai Patel & Reddy, 1988 — India
 C. natmataung Jäger & Minn, 2015 — Myanmar
 C. nigritarsis (Pavesi, 1897) — Ethiopia
 C. nigritus F. O. Pickard-Cambridge, 1897 — Brazil
 C. nigrolineatus Berland, 1913 — Ecuador
 C. nigromaculatus Thorell, 1899 — Central, West Africa
 C. noctuabundus Arts, 1912 — Kenya
 C. obscurus (Keyserling, 1877) — Colombia
 C. oligochronius Arts, 1912 — East Africa
 C. ornatus (Keyserling, 1877) — Brazil
 C. ottleyi (Petrunkevitch, 1930) — Puerto Rico
 C. palembangensis Strand, 1906 — Indonesia (Sumatra)
 C. paranus Strand, 1909 — Brazil
 C. parvoculatus Benoit, 1979 — South Africa
 C. parvus (Keyserling, 1877) — Colombia
 C. paubrasil Brescovit & Simó, 2007 — Brazil
 C. pauloterrai Brescovit & Simó, 2007 — Brazil
 C. peregrinus F. O. Pickard-Cambridge, 1900 — Guatemala, Costa Rica
 C. periculosus Bristowe, 1931 — Indonesia (Krakatau)
 C. philippinensis F. O. Pickard-Cambridge, 1897 — Philippines
 C. pilosus Franganillo, 1930 — Cuba
 C. pingu Jäger & Minn, 2015 — Myanmar
 C. pogonias Thorell, 1899 — Cameroon
 C. polli Hasselt, 1893 — Indonesia (Sumatra)
 C. potteri Simon, 1901 — Ethiopia, Equatorial Guinea (Bioko)
 C. pulchriventris (Simon, 1897) — Zimbabwe, South Africa
 C. pulvinatus Thorell, 1890 — Borneo
 C. racenisi Caporiacco, 1955 — Venezuela
 C. ramosi Alayón, 2002 — Cuba
 C. ramosus Thorell, 1887 — Myanmar
 C. ravidus (Simon, 1886) — Argentina
 C. rectipes F. O. Pickard-Cambridge, 1897 — Brazil, Guyana
 C. renivulvatus Strand, 1906 — Ghana
 C. rivulatus Pocock, 1900 — Cameroon, Gabon
 C. robustus Thorell, 1897 — Myanmar, Laos
 C. rubripes Keyserling, 1881 — Panama, Ecuador
 C. rufisternis Pocock, 1898 — Papua New Guinea (New Britain)
 C. rwandanus Benoit, 1981 — Rwanda
 C. saci Ono, 2010 — Vietnam
 C. sagittatus Giltay, 1935 — Indonesia (Sulawesi)
 C. saltensis Strand, 1909 — Argentina, Bolivia
 C. sarawakensis F. O. Pickard-Cambridge, 1897 — Borneo
 C. satanas Strand, 1909 — Ecuador
 C. serratipes F. O. Pickard-Cambridge, 1897 — Venezuela, Guyana, Brazil
 C. serrichelis Mello-Leitão, 1922 — Brazil
 C. sexmaculatus Roewer, 1961 — Senegal
 C. siankaan Alayón, 2002 — Mexico
 C. sigma (Schenkel, 1953) — Venezuela
 C. sikkimensis Gravely, 1931 — India
 C. silvaticus Benoit, 1981 — Congo
 C. similis F. O. Pickard-Cambridge, 1897 — Brazil
 C. simplex Thorell, 1897 — Myanmar, Laos
 C. somaliensis Benoit, 1979 — Somalia
 C. spectabilis Lessert, 1921 — Central, East Africa
 C. spiculus F. O. Pickard-Cambridge, 1897 — Colombia
 C. spiralis F. O. Pickard-Cambridge, 1900 — Costa Rica
 C. supinus F. O. Pickard-Cambridge, 1900 — Costa Rica
 C. tenuipes Denis, 1955 — Guinea
 C. theodorianum Jäger, 2012 — Laos
 C. thorelli F. O. Pickard-Cambridge, 1897 — Sri Lanka
 C. torvus Pavesi, 1883 — Ethiopia
 C. transvaalensis Benoit, 1981 — South Africa
 C. trinidensis (Alayón, 2001) — Trinidad
 C. tumidulus (Simon, 1887) — Myanmar
 C. tuniensis Patel & Reddy, 1988 — India
 C. uluguruensis Benoit, 1979 — Tanzania
 C. undulatus Steyn & Van der Donckt, 2003 — Ivory Coast
 C. unilineatus Simon, 1898 — St. Vincent
 C. vagus Blackwall, 1866 — West Africa
 C. validus Denis, 1955 — Guinea
 C. valverdiensis Peck, 1981 — USA
 C. valvularis (Hasselt, 1882) — Indonesia (Java, Sumatra)
 C. vatovae Caporiacco, 1940 — Ethiopia
 C. vehemens Keyserling, 1891 — Brazil
 C. vespertilio Mello-Leitão, 1941 — Colombia
 C. villasboasi Mello-Leitão, 1949 — Colombia, Ecuador, Brazil
 C. vividus Blackwall, 1865 — Central Africa
 C. w-notatus Petrunkevitch, 1925 — Panama
 C. walckenaeri Griffith, 1833 — possibly South America
 C. yaeyamensis Yoshida, 1998 — Taiwan, Japan

D

Diallomus

Diallomus Simon, 1897
 D. fuliginosus Simon, 1897 (type) — Sri Lanka
 D. speciosus Simon, 1897 — Sri Lanka

E

Enoploctenus

Enoploctenus Simon, 1897
 E. cyclothorax (Bertkau, 1880) (type) — Brazil
 E. distinctus (Caporiacco, 1947) — Guyana
 E. inazensis (Strand, 1909) — Ecuador
 E. luteovittatus (Simon, 1898) — St. Vincent
 E. maculipes Strand, 1909 — Brazil
 E. morbidus Mello-Leitão, 1939 — Brazil
 E. pedatissimus Strand, 1909 — Ecuador, Brazil
 E. penicilliger (Simon, 1898) — St. Vincent

G

Gephyroctenus

Gephyroctenus Mello-Leitão, 1936
 G. acre Polotow & Brescovit, 2008 — Brazil
 G. atininga Polotow & Brescovit, 2008 — Brazil
 G. divisor Polotow & Brescovit, 2008 — Brazil
 G. esteio Polotow & Brescovit, 2008 — Brazil
 G. juruti Polotow & Brescovit, 2008 — Peru, Brazil
 G. kolosvaryi Caporiacco, 1947 — Guyana
 G. mapia Polotow & Brescovit, 2008 — Brazil
 G. panguana Polotow & Brescovit, 2008 — Peru
 G. philodromoides Mello-Leitão, 1936 (type) — Peru, Brazil
 G. portovelho Polotow & Brescovit, 2008 — Brazil

Guasuctenus

Guasuctenus Polotow & Brescovit, 2019
 G. longipes (Keyserling, 1891) (type) — Brazil, Uruguay
 G. vittatissimus (Strand, 1916) — Brazil

I

Isoctenus

Isoctenus Bertkau, 1880
 I. areia Polotow & Brescovit, 2009 — Brazil
 I. charada Polotow & Brescovit, 2009 — Brazil
 I. corymbus Polotow, Brescovit & Pellegatti-Franco, 2005 — Brazil
 I. coxalis (F. O. Pickard-Cambridge, 1902) — Brazil
 I. eupalaestrus Mello-Leitão, 1936 — Brazil
 I. foliifer Bertkau, 1880 (type) — Brazil
 I. griseolus (Mello-Leitão, 1936) — Brazil
 I. guadalupei (Mello-Leitão, 1941) — Argentina
 I. herteli (Mello-Leitão, 1947) — Brazil
 I. janeirus (Walckenaer, 1837) — Brazil
 I. malabaris Polotow, Brescovit & Ott, 2007 — Brazil
 I. minusculus (Keyserling, 1891) — Brazil
 I. ordinario Polotow & Brescovit, 2009 — Brazil, Argentina
 I. segredo Polotow & Brescovit, 2009 — Brazil
 I. strandi Mello-Leitão, 1936 — Brazil
 I. taperae (Mello-Leitão, 1936) — Brazil

J

Janusia

Janusia Gray, 1973
 J. muiri Gray, 1973 (type) — Australia (Western Australia)

K

Kiekie

Kiekie Polotow & Brescovit, 2018
 K. antioquia Polotow & Brescovit, 2018 — Colombia
 K. barrocolorado Polotow & Brescovit, 2018 — Panama
 K. curvipes (Keyserling, 1881) — Mexico, Guatemala, Honduras, Nicaragua, Costa Rica, Panama
 K. garifuna Polotow & Brescovit, 2018 — Guatemala, Honduras
 K. griswoldi Polotow & Brescovit, 2018 — Costa Rica
 K. montanensis Polotow & Brescovit, 2018 — Costa Rica, Panama
 K. panamensis Polotow & Brescovit, 2018 — Panama
 K. sanjose Polotow & Brescovit, 2018 — Costa Rica
 K. sarapiqui Polotow & Brescovit, 2018 — Costa Rica
 K. sinuatipes (F. O. Pickard-Cambridge, 1897) (type) — Panama, Costa Rica
 K. verbena Polotow & Brescovit, 2018 — Costa Rica

L

Leptoctenus

Leptoctenus L. Koch, 1878
 L. agalenoides L. Koch, 1878 (type) — Australia
 L. byrrhus Simon, 1888 — USA, Mexico
 L. daoxianensis Yin, Tang & Gong, 2000 — China
 L. gertschi Peck, 1981 — Mexico
 L. paradoxus (F. O. Pickard-Cambridge, 1900) — Panama
 L. sonoraensis Peck, 1981 — Mexico

M

Macroctenus

Macroctenus Henrard & Jocqué, 2017
 M. herbicola Henrard & Jocqué, 2017 — Guinea
 M. kingsleyi (F. O. Pickard-Cambridge, 1898) (type) — West, Central Africa
 M. nimba Henrard & Jocqué, 2017 — Guinea
 M. occidentalis (F. O. Pickard-Cambridge, 1898) — West Africa
 M. vandenspiegeli Henrard & Jocqué, 2017 — Guinea

Mahafalytenus

Mahafalytenus Silva-Dávila, 2007
 M. fo Silva-Dávila, 2007 — Madagascar
 M. fohy Silva-Dávila, 2007 — Madagascar
 M. hafa Silva-Dávila, 2007 — Madagascar
 M. isalo Silva-Dávila, 2007 — Madagascar
 M. osy Silva-Dávila, 2007 — Madagascar
 M. paosy Silva-Dávila, 2007 — Madagascar
 M. tsilo Silva-Dávila, 2007 (type) — Madagascar

Montescueia

Montescueia Carcavallo & Martínez, 1961
 M. leitaoi Carcavallo & Martínez, 1961 (type) — Argentina

N

† Nanoctenus

† Nanoctenus Wunderlich, 1988
 † N. longipes Wunderlich, 1988

Nimbanahita

Nimbanahita Henrard & Jocqué, 2017
 N. montivaga Henrard & Jocqué, 2017 (type) — Guinea

Nothroctenus

Nothroctenus Badcock, 1932
 N. bahiensis Mello-Leitão, 1936 — Brazil
 N. fuxico Dias & Brescovit, 2004 — Brazil
 N. lineatus (Tullgren, 1905) — Bolivia
 N. marshi (F. O. Pickard-Cambridge, 1897) — Brazil, Paraguay, Bolivia
 N. omega (Mello-Leitão, 1929) — Brazil
 N. sericeus (Mello-Leitão, 1929) — Brazil
 N. spinulosus (Mello-Leitão, 1929) — Brazil
 N. stupidus Badcock, 1932 (type) — Paraguay

O

Ohvida

Ohvida Polotow & Brescovit, 2009
 O. andros Polotow & Brescovit, 2009 — Bahama Is.
 O. bimini Polotow & Brescovit, 2009 — Bahama Is.
 O. brevitarsus (Bryant, 1940) — Cuba
 O. coxana (Bryant, 1940) — Cuba
 O. fulvorufa (Franganillo, 1930) (type) — Cuba
 O. isolata (Bryant, 1940) — Cuba
 O. modesta (Bryant, 1942) — Puerto Rico
 O. turquino Polotow & Brescovit, 2009 — Cuba
 O. vernalis (Bryant, 1940) — Cuba

P

Parabatinga

Parabatinga Polotow & Brescovit, 2009
 P. brevipes (Keyserling, 1891) (type) — Colombia, Brazil, Bolivia, Paraguay, Argentina, Uruguay

Perictenus

Perictenus Henrard & Jocqué, 2017
 P. molecula Henrard & Jocqué, 2017 (type) — Guinea

Petaloctenus

Petaloctenus Jocqué & Steyn, 1997
 P. bossema Jocqué & Steyn, 1997 (type) — Ivory Coast
 P. clathratus (Thorell, 1899) — Cameroon
 P. cupido Van der Donckt & Jocqué, 2001 — Guinea
 P. lunatus Van der Donckt & Jocqué, 2001 — Nigeria
 P. songan Jocqué & Steyn, 1997 — Ivory Coast

Phoneutria

Phoneutria Perty, 1833
 P. bahiensis Simó & Brescovit, 2001 — Brazil
 P. boliviensis (F. O. Pickard-Cambridge, 1897) — Central, South America
 P. eickstedtae Martins & Bertani, 2007 — Brazil
 P. fera Perty, 1833 (type) — Colombia, Ecuador, Peru, Brazil, Suriname, Guyana
 P. keyserlingi (F. O. Pickard-Cambridge, 1897) — Brazil
 P. nigriventer (Keyserling, 1891) — Brazil, Uruguay, Paraguay, Argentina
 P. pertyi (F. O. Pickard-Cambridge, 1897) — Brazil
 P. reidyi (F. O. Pickard-Cambridge, 1897) — Colombia, Venezuela, Peru, Brazil, Guyana

Phymatoctenus

Phymatoctenus Simon, 1897
 P. comosus Simon, 1897 (type) — Brazil, Guyana
 P. sassii Reimoser, 1939 — Costa Rica
 P. tristani Reimoser, 1939 — Costa Rica

Piloctenus

Piloctenus Henrard & Jocqué, 2017
 P. gryseelsi Henrard & Jocqué, 2017 — Guinea
 P. haematostoma Jocqué & Henrard, 2017 — Guinea
 P. mirificus (Arts, 1912) — Togo, Ivory Coast, Guinea
 P. pilosus (Thorell, 1899) (type) — West, Central Africa

S

Sinoctenus

Sinoctenus Marusik, Zhang & Omelko, 2012
 S. zhui Marusik, Zhang & Omelko, 2012 (type) — China

Spinoctenus

Spinoctenus Hazzi, Polotow, Brescovit, González-Obando & Simó, 2018
 S. chocoensis Hazzi, Polotow, Brescovit, González-Obando & Simó, 2018 — Colombia
 S. eberhardi Hazzi, Polotow, Brescovit, González-Obando & Simó, 2018 — Colombia
 S. escalerete Hazzi, Polotow, Brescovit, González-Obando & Simó, 2018 — Colombia
 S. flammigerus Hazzi, Polotow, Brescovit, González-Obando & Simó, 2018 — Colombia
 S. florezi Hazzi, Polotow, Brescovit, González-Obando & Simó, 2018 — Colombia
 S. ginae Víquez, 2020 — Costa Rica (Cocos Is.)
 S. nambi Hazzi, Polotow, Brescovit, González-Obando & Simó, 2018 — Colombia
 S. pericos Hazzi, Polotow, Brescovit, González-Obando & Simó, 2018 — Colombia
 S. spinosus Hazzi, Polotow, Brescovit, González-Obando & Simó, 2018 — Colombia
 S. stephaniae Hazzi, Polotow, Brescovit, González-Obando & Simó, 2018 — Colombia
 S. tequendama Hazzi, Polotow, Brescovit, González-Obando & Simó, 2018 — Colombia
 S. yotoco Hazzi, Polotow, Brescovit, González-Obando & Simó, 2018 (type) — Colombia

T

Thoriosa

Thoriosa Simon, 1909
 T. fulvastra Simon, 1909 (type) — São Tomé and Príncipe, Sierra Leone
 T. spadicea (Simon, 1909) — São Tomé and Príncipe
 T. spinivulva (Simon, 1909) — São Tomé and Príncipe
 T. taurina (Simon, 1909) — São Tomé and Príncipe, Equatorial Guinea (Annobon Is.)

Toca

Toca Polotow & Brescovit, 2009
 T. bossanova Polotow & Brescovit, 2009 (type) — Brazil
 T. samba Polotow & Brescovit, 2009 — Brazil

Trogloctenus

Trogloctenus Lessert, 1935
 T. briali Ledoux, 2004 — Réunion
 T. fagei (Lessert, 1935) (type) — Congo

Trujillina

Trujillina Bryant, 1948
 T. hursti (Bryant, 1948) — Hispaniola
 T. isolata (Bryant, 1942) — Puerto Rico
 T. spinipes Bryant, 1948 (type) — Hispaniola

Tuticanus

Tuticanus Simon, 1897
 T. cruciatus Simon, 1897 (type) — Ecuador
 T. major (Keyserling, 1879) — Peru

V

Viracucha

Viracucha Lehtinen, 1967
 V. andicola (Simon, 1906) (type) — Bolivia
 V. exilis (Mello-Leitão, 1936) — Brazil
 V. mammifer (Mello-Leitão, 1939) — Brazil
 V. misionesicus (Mello-Leitão, 1945) — Argentina
 V. paraguayensis (Strand, 1909) — Brazil, Paraguay
 V. ridleyi (F. O. Pickard-Cambridge, 1897) — Brazil
 V. silvicola (Soares & Soares, 1946) — Brazil

W

Wiedenmeyeria

Wiedenmeyeria Schenkel, 1953
 W. falconensis Schenkel, 1953 (type) — Venezuela

References

Ctenidae